The KVLY-TV mast (formerly the KTHI-TV mast) is a television-transmitting mast in Blanchard, North Dakota. It is used by Fargo station KVLY-TV channel 11 and KXJB-LD's Argusville/Valley City/Mayville translator K28MA-D channel 28.  Completed in 1963, it was once the tallest structure in the world, and stood at 2,063 feet (629 meters) until 2019, when the top mount VHF antenna was removed for the FCC spectrum repack, dropping the height to 1,987 ft (605.6 m).

In 1974, it was succeeded by the Warsaw radio mast as the world's tallest structure. The Warsaw mast collapsed in 1991, again making the KVLY-TV mast the tallest structure in the world until the Burj Khalifa surpassed it in 2008. It became the third tallest when the Tokyo Skytree was completed in 2012, then the fourth tallest when the Shanghai Tower took third place in 2013. It remained the tallest structure in the Western Hemisphere, and the tallest broadcasting mast in the world until the antenna removal in 2019.

Location

It became the tallest artificial structure, and the first man-made structure to exceed  in height, upon the completion of its construction on August 13, 1963.

Construction
The tower was built by Hamilton Erection Company of York, South Carolina, and Kline Iron and Steel, and required thirty days to complete, at a cost of approximately $500,000 (roughly $ today). Construction was completed August 13, 1963.

Owners

Owned by Gray Television of Atlanta, Georgia, the tower broadcasts at 356 kW on channel 36 for television station KVLY-TV (channel 11 PSIP, an NBC/CBS affiliate) which is based in Fargo, North Dakota. CBS/CW+ affiliate KXJB-LD's translator K28MA-D also broadcasts on this tower at 15 kW on UHF channel 28 (also its virtual channel).

When the mast was built, the call letters of the television station for which it was built were changed to KTHI, the "HI" referring to the height of the mast. The top is reachable by a two-person service elevator (built by Park Manufacturing of Charlotte, North Carolina) or ladder.

Specifications
It takes up  of land with its guy anchors.

Federal rule change
Some time after its completion, the Federal Communications Commission (FCC) and Federal Aviation Administration (FAA) imposed a policy that states, "Although there is no absolute height limit for antenna towers, both agencies have established a rebuttable presumption against structures over 2,000 feet above ground level." The FCC and FAA may approve a taller structure in "exceptional cases."

Gallery

Structures of similar height
KRDK-TV mast
KXTV/KOVR tower

See also
List of tallest structures in the world
List of tallest structures in the United States

References

External links

Tower web page at KVLY-TV

Drawings of KVLY/KTHI TV Mast from the Skyscraper Page
KVLY and KXJB Towers from PBPhase.com
Video of the KVLY Tower, summer 2009 from YouTube

Towers in North Dakota
Mass media in North Dakota
Buildings and structures in Traill County, North Dakota
Radio masts and towers in the United States
Gray Television
1963 establishments in North Dakota
Towers completed in 196300